The John Smith's People's Race is an amateur flat race for members of the public, held at Aintree Racecourse during the April Grand National meeting. It was introduced in 2006.

A total prize fund of £100,000 has been donated by the sponsors, John Smith's Brewery. The fund is donated to the charities of the competitors' choosing. All competitors automatically get £5,000 for their charities, while the winner's charity gets an additional £50,000.

References 

Horse races in Great Britain
Recurring sporting events established in 2006
2006 establishments in England